Zircotec is a high temperature coating and heat barrier manufacturer, based in Abingdon near Oxford, England. It uses plasma-sprayed ceramic materials to provide thermal and abrasive resistance to components - with a focus on automotive exhaust systems. Its best-known products include coloured thermal barrier coatings and Zircoflex - a flexible ceramic heatshield.

History

1960-2003: Development at UKAEA
Zircotec began life as part of the United Kingdom Atomic Energy Authority, where its high temperature coatings and heat barrier processes were originally developed for the nuclear industry. It was based at the Atomic Energy Research Establishment near Harwell, Oxfordshire. At the time, this was the main centre for atomic energy research and development in the United Kingdom.

In 1994, Zircotec's thermal barrier coatings were first used in a motorsport application. These coatings were applied to the exhaust systems of Subaru rally cars to lower in-cabin temperatures. After initial success, these high temperature coatings were then used on a variety of other vehicles, including Formula One cars and trucks.

2003-09: Foundation of Zircotec
Zircotec was bought by a venture capital fund in 2003. Subsequently, Zircotec shifted its focus from the nuclear industry, towards general industry and automotive applications. As a result, Zircotec developed Thermohold coatings for high performance automotive and classic car applications. Their main Thermohold coating was called Performance White, a white dual-layer plasma-sprayed ceramic.

In July 2007, Terry Graham was appointed as the new managing director. Later that year, high performance sportscar manufacturer Koenigsegg announced it would be using Zircotec coatings on its CCX supercar. Additionally, in October, Zircotec became involved in the world land speed steam-car record attempt, supplying its coatings for thermal protection of sensitive components - this attempt was successful a year later.

In June 2008, Zircotec developed a plasma-sprayed ceramic coating specifically for composite materials. Predominantly aimed at motorsport and high-performance car applications, coated composites could now function at temperatures above their melting points.

In September 2008, Zircotec launched its Performance Colours range. This range is based on Zircotec's Performance White coating, but has an additional coloured finish - offering a more robust and maintainable finish. Zircotec initially released thirteen different colours, with plans to increase this variety over the next few years.

2009-19: Management buyout
Zircotec's directors completed a management buyout early in 2009.

In 2010, the company's headquarters were relocated to the nearby town of Abingdon, Oxfordshire. The move was completed to provide increased production capacity and to accommodate future business growth.

In 2011, Zircotec developed the world's first flexible ceramic heatshield, named Zircoflex.

In July 2019, Zircotec experienced a fire at its premises and temporarily relocated to a nearby facility.

2019-present: Expansion
Zircotec announced an investment of £2.5m into a new 20,000 square foot premises in Abingdon which was completed by October 2019. This offers a ten-fold increase in capacity with a significant increase in workforce

In March 2021 the release of a new heatshield product - ZircoFlex SHIELD - was announced.

In June 2022, Zircotec procured a further 10,000 square foot building which will be dedicated to producing technology for low and zero carbon vehicles.

Products

Exhaust System Coatings

Performance Range

Zircotec's Performance Range is based on its Thermohold coating. Each coating consists of a ceramic based material, plasma-sprayed in two layers onto the component. This coating is predominantly used for thermal insulation, thermal protection and its anti-wear properties. When used on an automotive exhaust system, exhaust skin temperature and under-bonnet temperature have been reduced by 33% and 50 °C, respectively.

The range contains fifteen individual coatings - one white coating (Performance White), and fourteen coloured coatings (Performance Colours). The Performance Colours coatings are identical to the Performance White coating, but consist of an additional coloured top layer - offering a more robust and maintainable finish. The Performance White coating is suitable for temperatures of up to 1400 °C, whilst Performance Colours can be used up to 900 °C. The current colours on offer are as follows: Graphite, Solid Black, Metallic Black, Alaskan Blue, Warm Grey, Antique Silver, Sterling Silver, Chilled Red, Yellow Gold, Copper, Aqua Green, Fern Green, Aged Brown and Ultra Blue.

Primary Range
Zircotec's primary range was developed as a lower cost derivative of its Thermohold coatings. Suitable up to 900 °C, it offers less thermal performance to the Performance Range with a 25% reduction in exhaust system temperatures. Currently Zircotec only offers a black finish, but there are plans to make more colours available.

Carbon Composite Coatings
Zircotec offers a plasma-sprayed ceramic coating specifically for composite materials. Commonly used on CFRP, this coating protects against heat, fire and abrasion.

Heatshield Materials

Zircoflex
Zircoflex is a flexible aluminium-backed ceramic heat-shield, claimed to be the first-ever such product. Based on a derivative of Zircotec's Thermohold coating, close-packed ceramic platelets are plasma-sprayed onto an aluminium foil. This allows tight folding of the heat-shield through 180°, whilst still maintaining thermal protection.

Zircoflex is 0.25mm thick and lightweight at 460g/m2. The heat-shield is useful at temperatures up to 500 °C.

Zircoflex Form

Zircoflex Shield

Ceramic Coatings and Metal Coatings
A range of plasma-sprayed coatings for all industries for thermal, abrasion, insulation or aesthetic purposes.

Ceramic Products
Zircotec manufactures a number of different industrial ceramic components. Some examples are as follows:
 Susceptor tubes for optical fibre production;
 Ceramic furnace components, such as ceramic tubes;
 Ceramic filters;
 High temperature ceramic crucibles;
 Ceramic components for electrical and thermal insulation.

Zircotec in Motorsports
Zircotec works closely with motorsport teams from various categories, including Formula One, the British Touring Car Championship and NASCAR.
Since 2018, Zircotec has maintained a technical partnership with Power Maxed Racing

OEM providers
 Aston Martin Valkyrie  
 Aston Martin One-77
 Ducati Diavel Diesel
 Lamborghini Murciélago
 Koenigsegg CCX
 New Holland Low Carbon Gas Tractor

Awards and nominations
 2013: Runner-up in the Society of Motor Manufacturers & Traders Award for Automotive Innovation 2013
 2013: Finalist for the BEEA 2013 Material Application of the Year Award
 October 2010: Winner of the 2010 Plastics Industry Best Technology Application of the Year Award for Zircotec's protective ceramic coating for composites.
 2009: Finalist for the 2009 British Engineering Excellence Small Company of the Year Award.
 2009: Runner up in the 2009 Oxfordshire Innovation Enterprise Awards.
 2008: Commendation received from the 2008 Manufacturer Awards.
 January 2008: Nomination for the 2008 MIA Business Excellence Award for Export Achievement.
 July 2019: Shortlisted for British Engineering Excellence Award 
 October 2019: SME of the Year finalist 
October 2021: Make UK Manufacturing Awards (South). Runners up for the Innovation Award and finalists of the following categories:
SME of the Year
Growth & Strategy Finalists.

References

External links 
 zircotec.com

Chemical companies of England
Manufacturing companies of England
Companies based in Oxfordshire
Coatings
English brands
Paint manufacturers